Moustapha Luete Ava Dongo (born 27 January 1996) is a Congolese professional footballer who plays as a defender for Royal Antwerp

Honours
Antwerp
 Belgian Cup: 2019–20

References

1996 births
Living people
Democratic Republic of the Congo footballers
Democratic Republic of the Congo international footballers
Daring Club Motema Pembe players
AS Vita Club players
Royal Antwerp F.C. players
Association football defenders
Democratic Republic of the Congo expatriate footballers
Expatriate footballers in Belgium
Democratic Republic of the Congo expatriate sportspeople in Belgium
Footballers from Kinshasa

21st-century Democratic Republic of the Congo people